The 2011 GP2 Series season was the forty-fifth season of the second-tier of Formula One feeder championship and also seventh season under the GP2 Series moniker, the pan-European motor racing series for single specification open wheel GP2 cars. Thirteen teams competed over a nine event series that run from 7 May at Istanbul Park in Turkey to September 11 at Monza in Italy. The series again performed the role of a series for developing emerging young drivers, acting as the principal supporting motor racing series that fills in time between sessions of the nine World Championship Formula One Grands Prix that are held in Europe. The championship was won by reigning GP2 Asia champion Romain Grosjean at the penultimate round of the series. Luca Filippi, Jules Bianchi and Charles Pic were all divided just by two points in their battle for the second, third and fourth places respectively. Christian Vietoris, Davide Valsecchi, Stefano Coletti, Esteban Gutiérrez and Fabio Leimer was the other race winners.

Following a three-year cycle, the previous GP2 chassis was replaced by a brand new car, the GP2/11, built by Italian racing car manufacturer Dallara. The engine configuration remained the same until the end of the 2017 season, with the only modifications being to the exhaust systems. The series changed tyre supplier from Bridgestone to Pirelli for 2011–13. The 2011 season saw the addition of two new teams to the grid, Carlin and Team AirAsia. Meanwhile, DPR was not selected to continue in the series.

On 22 November 2010 it was announced that Renault would no longer badge their Mecachrome GP2 Series engines, instead Mecachrome would run its own engine program from 2011 onwards.
All GP2 Series cars had a reverse gear for the first time in the series.

Teams and drivers
 This section lists drivers who competed in the regular season. For the drivers who competed in the non-championship race in Abu Dhabi, see 2011 GP2 Final.

Team changes
 David Price Racing left GP2, while Carlin and Team AirAsia joined the series, filling the vacancies left by DPR and Durango (who left ahead of the 2010 season).
 Lotus Cars lent its name to ART Grand Prix in a similar arrangement to their sponsorship of Takuma Sato and KV Racing Technology in the IndyCar Series, while Team Lotus is behind the new Team AirAsia outfit. Aside from the name, there is no crossover between Lotus ART and Team Air Asia.

Driver changes
 Changed teams
 Sam Bird moved to iSport International after competing in his rookie season for ART Grand Prix. He partnered Marcus Ericsson, who moves over from Super Nova Racing.
 Johnny Cecotto Jr. switched from Trident Racing to Ocean Racing Technology, having competed for Trident in the first eight meetings of the 2010 season.
 Max Chilton moved from Ocean Racing Technology to be part of Carlin's inaugural GP2 pairing.
 Rodolfo González returned to Trident Racing after a season with Arden International. González drove for Trident at the German round in 2009.
 After driving for DPR for most of his GP2 career to date, Michael Herck moved to Scuderia Coloni.
 After driving for Super Nova Racing in his rookie season, Josef Král switched to Arden International.
 Fabio Leimer moved from Ocean Racing Technology to Rapax.
 Charles Pic switched from Arden International to partner Giedo van der Garde at Barwa Addax.
 Luiz Razia moved from team's champions Rapax to debutants Team Air Asia. Davide Valsecchi joined him after a season with iSport International.

 Entering/Re-Entering GP2 Series
 Formula Renault 3.5 Series champion Mikhail Aleshin has extended his collaboration with Carlin for GP2, making a return to GP2 after contesting two meetings in 2007 with ART Grand Prix.
 Stefano Coletti returned to the series with Trident Racing, having competed in two rounds in 2009 for Durango.
 Fairuz Fauzy made his comeback to the series with Super Nova Racing, the team that Fauzy competed with in 2006 and also in the 2008 Asia Series.
 GP3 Series champion Esteban Gutiérrez moved up to GP2 with Lotus ART, having raced for the team in GP3.
 Julián Leal made his debut in the series with Rapax, having finished 20th in the Formula Renault 3.5 Series for International DracoRacing.
 After a part season in the Formula Renault 2.0 Northern European Cup, Kevin Mirocha graduated into GP2 with Ocean Racing Technology.
 FIA Formula Two Championship runner-up Jolyon Palmer joined Arden International.
 Davide Rigon returned to the series with Scuderia Coloni, having driven for Trident Racing in 2009.
 Pål Varhaug moved up from the GP3 Series to drive for DAMS.

 Leaving GP2
 2010 champion Pastor Maldonado will from Rapax to compete in Formula One with Williams alongside Rubens Barrichello.
 Sergio Pérez moved from Barwa Addax to compete in Formula One with Sauber alongside former Asia Series champion Kamui Kobayashi.
 Ho-Pin Tung moved to the IndyCar Series as a part-time entry with Dragon Racing, and failed to qualify for the 2011 Indianapolis 500.
 Alberto Valerio returned to his native Brazil to compete in the Copa Caixa Stock Car series.
 Adrian Zaugg moved to Auto GP, but completed only one event in 2011.

 Midseason Changes
 A number of midseason changes were also made during the season, to replace other drivers. Scuderia Coloni's Davide Rigon suffered stable fractures of the tibia and fibula in an accident with Julián Leal in Istanbul. He was replaced by Kevin Ceccon in Montmeló and Monaco after Vietoris' accident in Istanbul left him suffering from severe headaches. He continued with his campaign in DTM despite this, and returned to GP2 in time for the Valencia round.
 For Monaco, Oliver Turvey made his return to the category, replacing Mikhail Aleshin at Carlin. Turvey was later replaced by Álvaro Parente in Valencia. Aleshin returned at the Hungaroring, as Parente had a prior commitment to compete for McLaren at the Spa 24 Hours.
 Prior to the round at the Nürburgring, Kevin Ceccon left Scuderia Coloni to concentrate on Auto GP. He was replaced by fellow Auto GP racer Luca Filippi from Super Nova Racing. Filippi's vacated seat was taken by Adam Carroll, who returned to the series after participating between 2005 and 2008. Ceccon later returned to the team for the non-championship round in Abu Dhabi.
 For the round held at Spa-Francorchamps, Brendon Hartley replaced Kevin Mirocha in the Ocean Racing Technology team.
 For the round held at Monza, the injured Stefano Coletti was replaced by Stéphane Richelmi.

2011 Schedule
The 2011 calendar was announced on 21 December 2010. The series will consist of nine rounds, one less than in 2010, as the Abu Dhabi round will return to the GP2 Asia Series and will not be replaced. It will support all the European Formula One events.

On 12 July 2011, it was announced that a non-championship round will take place in Abu Dhabi under the name 2011 GP2 Final.

Results

Championship standings
Scoring system
Points are awarded to the top 8 classified finishers in the Feature race, and to the top 6 classified finishers in the Sprint race. The pole-sitter in the feature race will also receive two points, and one point is given to the driver who set the fastest lap inside the top ten in both the feature and sprint races. No extra points are awarded to the pole-sitter in the sprint race.

Feature race points

Sprint race points
Points are awarded to the top 6 classified finishers.

Drivers' Championship

Notes:
† — Drivers did not finish the race, but were classified as they completed over 90% of the race distance.

Teams' Championship

Notes:
† — Drivers did not finish the race, but were classified as they completed over 90% of the race distance.

Notes

References

External links
 GP2 Series official website

GP2 Series
GP2 Series seasons
GP2 Series